Clas Patrik Juhlin (born April 24, 1970) is a Swedish former professional ice hockey forward who won Olympic gold at the 1994 Winter Olympics and was the greatest goal scorer of the winning team with 7 goals in 8 matches. He played parts of two seasons in the National Hockey League (NHL) with the Philadelphia Flyers, but spent most of his career in the Swedish Elitserien and Allsvenskan playing for Västerås IK. He also played in the Finnish SM-liiga with Jokerit and the Swiss National League A with SC Bern and HC Davos.

Achievements
 Gold medal winner at the Winter Olympics in 1994
 NLA 2001/02 Top goal scorer

Awards
 Swedish All-Star Team 1994
 AHL All Star Team (1996–97)

International play

Juhlin played a total of 80 games for the Swedish national team.

Career statistics

Regular season and playoffs

International

References

External links
 

1970 births
HC Davos players
Hershey Bears players
Ice hockey players at the 1994 Winter Olympics
Jokerit players
Living people
Medalists at the 1994 Winter Olympics
Olympic gold medalists for Sweden
Olympic ice hockey players of Sweden
Olympic medalists in ice hockey
Philadelphia Flyers draft picks
Philadelphia Flyers players
Philadelphia Phantoms players
SC Bern players
Swedish expatriate ice hockey players in Finland
Swedish expatriate sportspeople in Switzerland
Swedish expatriate ice hockey players in the United States
Swedish ice hockey left wingers
VIK Västerås HK players